"Girl's Got Rhythm" is a song by Australian rock band AC/DC. It is found on their 1979 album Highway to Hell. The song was released as a single the same year.

A British EP was also released in 1979 containing the songs: A1. "Girl's Got Rhythm"; A2. "If You Want Blood (You've Got It)"; B1. "Hell Ain't a Bad Place to Be" (live; taken from If You Want Blood); B2. "Rock and Roll Damnation" (live; taken from If You Want Blood).

Reception
Smash Hits said, "Well, I'm lost for words. There's this absurd man screeching about all the girls he seen all over the world and a riff that I think I've heard before. It was either 1974 or 1975."

Other appearances

A live version can be found on the live album Let There Be Rock: The Movie, part of the Bonfire box set. A video of the band performing the song is on the DVD Family Jewels.

The song is also featured in the 2006 film DOA: Dead or Alive.

Personnel
Bon Scott – vocals
Angus Young – lead guitar, backing vocals
Malcolm Young – rhythm guitar, backing vocals
Cliff Williams – bass guitar, backing vocals
Phil Rudd – drums

References

External links

AC/DC songs
1979 singles
Song recordings produced by Robert John "Mutt" Lange
Songs written by Bon Scott
Songs written by Angus Young
Songs written by Malcolm Young
1979 songs
Atlantic Records singles

pt:Girls Got Rhythm
Heavy metal songs